Syringa pubescens is a species of flowering plant in the lilac genus of the family Oleaceae, native to Korea and China (Gansu, Hebei, Henan, Hubei, Jilin, Liaoning, Ningxia, Qinghai, Shaanxi, Shandong, Shanxi, Sichuan).

The specific epithet pubescens means "downy", referring to the texture of the leaves.

Three subspecies (formerly listed as separate species) are recognized :

Syringa pubescens subsp. julianae - syn. S. julianae
Syringa pubescens subsp. microphylla - syn. S. microphylla 
Syringa pubescens subsp. patula  (also Syringa velutina) - syn. S. patula (Korean lilac, Manchurian lilac)

The cultivar S. pubescens subsp. microphylla 'Superba' has gained the Royal Horticultural Society's Award of Garden Merit.

According to some authorities Syringa meyeri C.K.Schneid. is a synonym of S. pubescens. The cultivar ‘Palibin’ has also won the AGM. However, the nearly palmate leaf venation of plants labelled S. meyeri is noticeably distinct from the pinnate venation of other forms of S. pubescens.

References

Flora of Korea
Plants described in 1840
Flora of Gansu
Flora of Hebei
Flora of Henan
Flora of Hubei
Flora of Jilin
Flora of Liaoning
Flora of Ningxia
Flora of Qinghai
Flora of Shaanxi
Flora of Shandong
Flora of Shanxi
Flora of Sichuan
pubescens
Taxa named by Nikolai Turczaninow